Marcel Brion (21 November 1895 – 23 October 1984) was a French essayist, literary critic, novelist, and historian.

Early life
The son of a lawyer, Brion was classmates in Thiers with Marcel Pagnol and Albert Cohen. After completing his secondary education in Collège Champittet, Switzerland, he studied law at the University of Aix-en-Provence.

Career
Counsel to the bar of Marseille between 1920 and 1924, he abandoned his legal career to turn to literature.

Brion wrote nearly a hundred books in his career, ranging from historical biography to examinations of Italian and German art, and turning later in life to novels. His most famous collection of stories is the 1942 Les Escales de la Haute Nuit ("The Shore Leaves of the Deepest Night"). An essay of Brion appears in Our Exagmination Round His Factification for Incamination of Work in Progress, the important 1929 critical appreciation of James Joyce's Finnegans Wake.

He was a friend of the philosopher Xavier Tilliette.

In 1964, Brion was elected to the Académie française's chair 33, replacing his friend Jean-Louis Vaudoyer. Other distinctions include membership in the Legion of Honour, the Croix de guerre, a Grand Officer in the French Order of Merit, and an Officer of the Ordre des Arts et des Lettres.

The 1982 television program The Romantic Spirit, which aired in the U.S. on the A&E (TV channel) from 1985–1991, credits Brion as having "devised" the series.

French language publications

Arts and literature 
 Giotto, Rieder, 1928
 Turner, Rieder, 1929
 Botticelli, Crès, 1932
 Klee, Somogy, 1955
 Kandinsky, Somogy, 1960
  L'Œuvre de Balzac, 16 volumes, Classiques-CFL, 1950-1953
 Fabrizio Clerici, Milan, Electra Editrice, 1955
 L'Allemagne romantique, 4 vol., Albin Michel :
 Vol. I - Kleist, Brentano, Wackenroder, Tieck, Caroline von Günderode, 1962
 Vol. II - Novalis, Hoffmann, Jean-Paul, Eichendorff, 1963
 Vol. III - Le Voyage initiatique - 1, 1977 ; . Table : Le Voyage initiatique, Thème ; Variations ; Pressentiment et Présence de Joseph von Eichendorff ; La Loge invisible de Jean-Paul ; Les Voyages de Franz Sternbald de Ludwig Tieck ; Heinrich von Ofterdingen de Novalis ; Le Voyage en Orient de Hermann Hesse
 Vol. IV - Le Voyage initiatique - 2, 1978
 Venise, Albin Michel 1962
 L'Art romantique, Hachette, 1963
 L'Âge d'or de la peinture hollandaise, Elsevier, 1964
 L'Œil, l'esprit et la main du peintre, Plon, 1966
 Peinture romantique, Albin Michel, 1967
 La Grande Aventure de la peinture religieuse, Perrin, 1968
 Rembrandt, Albin Michel, 1969
 Titien, Somogy, 1971
 Guardi, Henri Scrépel, 1976
 Goethe, Albin Michel, 1982
 Robert Schumann et l'âme romantique, Albin Michel, 1954
 Paul Cézanne, Bordas, 1988
 Art fantastique, Albin Michel 1989
 Michel-Ange, Albin Michel, 1995
 Léonard de Vinci, Albin Michel, 1995
 Mozart, Perrin, 2006
 Le Théâtre des esprits, préface d'Agnès Brion et note liminaire de Patrick Brion, La tour verte, 2011

Biographies 
 Bartolomé de Las Casas, Père des Indiens, Plon, 1928
 La Vie d'Attila, Gallimard, 1928
 Rudyard Kipling, Éditions de la Nouvelle Revue critique, 1929
 Théodoric, roi des Ostrogoths, Payot, 1935 ; 1979
La reine Jeanne, Société des bibliophiles de Provence, 1936; 1944 (Robert Laffont)
 Laurent le Magnifique, Albin Michel, 1937
 Blanche de Castille, Les éditions de France, 1939
 Machiavel, Albin Michel, 1948
 Frédéric II de Hohenstaufen, Tallandier, 1948
 Le Pape et le Prince - Les Borgia, Hachette, 1953
 Tamerlan, Albin Michel, 1999
 Charles le Téméraire, grand-duc d'Occident, Hachette, 1947. Réédition : Tallandier, 2006, compte rendu en ligne.
 Les Amantes courts essais sur Diotima - Alcoforado - Frédérique Brion - Charlotte Stieglitz et Louise Labé, Albin Michel, 1941

History 
 Les Mondes antiques, Arthème Fayard, 1954 ; Tallandier, 1977. 9 volumes : L'Égypte (1 et 2), L'Orient (3), Les Hébreux (4), La Grèce (5 et 6), Rome (7 à 9)

Novels 
 Le Caprice espagnol (Gallimard nrf, 1929)
 La Folie Céladon (Éditions Correa, 1935, Albin Michel 1963, et livre de Poche, 1989)
 Les Escales de la haute nuit, nouvelles, (Laffont, 1942, réédite bibliothèque Marabout, 1971, puis Albin Michel, 1986)
 Un enfant de la terre et du ciel (Albin Michel, 1943)
 Château d'ombre (Luf, 1943, puis Albin Michel, 1960)
 L’Enchanteur (Luf, 1947)
 La Chanson de l'Oiseau étranger (Albin Michel, 1958)
 La Ville de sable, (Albin Michel, 1959)
 La Rose de cire (Albin Michel, 1964)
 De l'autre côté de la forêt (Albin Michel, 1966)
 Les Miroirs et les gouffres (Albin Michel, 1968)
 L’Ombre d’un arbre mort (Albin Michel, 1970)
 Nous avons traversé la montagne (Albin Michel, 1972)
 La Fête de la tour des âmes (Albin Michel, 1974)
 Algues - fragment d'un journal intime (Albin Michel, 1976)
 Les Vaines Montagnes (Albin Michel, 1985)
 Le Journal d’un visiteur (Albin Michel, 1980)
 Villa des hasards (Albin Michel, 1984)
 Ivre d’un rêve héroïque et brutal (de Fallois, 2014)

English language publications
Pompeii & Herculaneum: The glory and the grief.
Albrecht Dürer, 'The World of Art Library' series

References 

1895 births
1984 deaths
Writers from Marseille
Members of the Académie Française
Officiers of the Légion d'honneur
Recipients of the Croix de Guerre 1914–1918 (France)
Grand Officers of the Ordre national du Mérite
Officiers of the Ordre des Arts et des Lettres
French male writers
20th-century French male writers
Collège Champittet alumni